Beryozovsky (masculine), Beryozovskaya (feminine), or Beryozovskoye (neuter) is the name of several inhabited localities in Russia.

Republic of Kalmykia
As of 2010, one rural locality in the Republic of Kalmykia bears this name:
Beryozovskoye (rural locality), a selo in Yashaltinsky District

Kemerovo Oblast
As of 2010, two inhabited localities in Kemerovo Oblast bear this name:
Beryozovsky, Kemerovo Oblast, a town of oblast significance
Beryozovsky (rural locality), Kemerovo Oblast, a rural locality (a settlement) under the jurisdiction of the urban-type settlement of Zelenogorsky

Sverdlovsk Oblast
As of 2010, two inhabited localities in Sverdlovsk Oblast bear this name:
Beryozovsky, Sverdlovsk Oblast, a town of oblast significance
Beryozovsky (rural locality), Sverdlovsk Oblast, a rural locality (a settlement) in Beryozovsky Selsoviet of Alapayevsky District

Volgograd Oblast
As of 2010, one rural locality in Volgograd Oblast bears this name:
Beryozovskaya (rural locality), a stanitsa in Beryozovsky Selsoviet of Danilovsky District

Other
Beryozovsky, several rural localities in other federal subjects